Ali Chuk is a populated place and census designated place in Pima County, Arizona, United States. It is located adjacent to the border with Mexico. It is not to be confused with another village on the reservation, Ali Chukson.

Demographics

Ali Chuk first appeared on the 2010 U.S. Census as a census-designated place (CDP).

References

Populated places in Pima County, Arizona